The Gund Institute for Environment (founded 1992), formerly known as the Gund Institute for Ecological Economics and more commonly known as Gund Institute, is a research institute for transdisciplinary scholarship, based at the University of Vermont (UVM) and comprising diverse faculty, students, and collaborators worldwide. The Gund Institute offers graduate-level training where students are exposed to a wide range of expertise, perspectives, and techniques through course offerings, weekly discussions and seminars, and research mentoring. The Gund Institute offers a Certificate of Graduate Study in Ecological Economics, available both to UVM Graduate students and to anyone pursuing continuing education. In addition, it has a series of problem-solving workshops called "Ateliers" and nearly two hundred educational videos.

Mission 

The purpose of the Gund Institute is to conduct research at the interface of ecological, social, and economic systems, develop creative, practical solutions to local and global environmental challenges, and provide future leaders with the tools and understanding necessary to navigate the transition to a sustainable society. Led by Director Taylor Ricketts, the Gund Institute is a community comprising Gund Fellows, Affiliates, Graduate Students, Visiting Scholars, and Staff. At UVM, faculty aren't appointed to the Institute itself but are affiliated with other departments all around the university.

Projects 
Three broad, interrelated themes provide centers of gravity for the Gund Institute's research, training, and outreach activities: Nature's Benefits, Ecological Economies, and Healthy Landscapes and Seascapes. Among their research projects are the Vermont Genuine Progress Indicator (GPI) and Natural Capital Project.

History 
The Gund Institute was founded by Robert Costanza in 1991 as the Institute for Ecological Economics at the University of Maryland. In 2002, it was moved to the UVM's Rubenstein School of Environment and Natural Resources and renamed the Gund Institute, after its major benefactors, the Gund family of Cleveland, Ohio. Robert Costanza continued as Director until 2010, when he left to help build a similar institute at Portland State University. Jon Erickson was Managing Director from 2009 to 2012. Taylor Ricketts, former Director of the Conservation Science Program of the World Wildlife Fund, was recruited as Director in 2011.

Related Books 
Ecological Economics, Second Edition: Principles and Applications, by Herman Daly and Josh Farley 

Natural Capital: Theory and Practice of Mapping Ecosystem Services by Taylor Ricketts, et al.

The Very Hungry City: Urban Energy Efficiency and the Economic Fate of Cities, by Austin Troy 

Listed: Dispatches from America's Endangered Species Act, by Joe Roman

References

External links 
 Official Website

See also 
Herman Daly

University of Vermont
Ecological economics
1992 establishments in Vermont